Pseudosparna is a genus of beetles in the family Cerambycidae, containing the following species:

 Pseudosparna amoena Mermudes & Monne, 2009
Pseudosparna antonkozlovi Santos-Silva & Nascimento, 2019
 Pseudosparna aragua Mermudes & Monne, 2009
 Pseudosparna boliviana Monne & Monne, 2011
 Pseudosparna flaviceps (Bates, 1863)
 Pseudosparna luteolineata Mermudes & Monne, 2009
Pseudosparna mantis Devesa & Santos-Silva, 2020
Pseudosparna pichincha Monné & Monné, 2014
Pseudosparna triangulata Nascimento & McClarin, 2018
Pseudosparna tucurui Monné & Monné, 2014
Pseudosparna ubirajara Dalens & Touroult, 2015

References

Acanthocinini